The 2000 Italy rugby union tour was a series of matches played in July 2000 in Samoa and Fiji by the Italy national rugby union team. It was the first tour after their debut in the Six Nations Championship, and with the new coach Brad Johnstone.  The Italians suffered losses in all four games. The team was very renewed due to the international retirement by Diego Dominguez and Alessandro Troncon, that came back only in November.

Results 
'Scores and results list Italy's points tally first.

References
 

2000 rugby union tours
tour
2000
2000 in Fijian rugby union
2000
2000
2000 in Oceanian rugby union
2000 in Samoan rugby union